Axemann Village is an unincorporated community in Centre County, in the U.S. state of Pennsylvania.

History
Axemann was named after the local Mann Axe Factory. The community once was a center of axe manufacturing in Pennsylvania.

References

Unincorporated communities in Pennsylvania
Unincorporated communities in Centre County, Pennsylvania